Baishui is a county of Weinan City, Shaanxi Province, China.

Baishui County
Baishui County contains the following smaller divisions: Chengguan Township, Dukang Township, Xigu Township, Fenglei Township, Yaohe Township, Chengjiao Village, North Jingtou Village, Leiya Village, Leicun Village, Mengong Village, Shoushui Village, Zongzi Village, Shiguan Village, Beiyuan Village, Dayang Village, Xudao Village, Lingao Village, and Yuntai Village.

Two of Baishui's areas are well-known or of historical importance.  Shiguan Village is, according to tradition, the birthplace of Cang Jie, a famed figure in ancient Chinese history who was scribe and historian for the Yellow Emperor and is credited with the creation of Chinese characters.  The village's name, Shiguan 史官, means “Historian”.  Dukang Township produces the "Du Kang" brand of Chinese baijiu, so named for the legendary figure Du Kang, a Xia Dynasty man credited with the invention of liquor in China.  Though not fully referenced in classical literature, Du Kang was famously lauded in verse by Three Kingdoms general Cao Cao: "What means can loose man's worries?  He has only Du Kang..."

On Friday, November 9, 2018 at around 11:00 AM local time, a cache of around 100,000 pieces of Northern Song dynasty currency (in weight totalling 460 kilograms) was discovered at a construction site in Baishui County.

Administrative divisions
As 2019, Baishui County is divided to 1 subdistrict and 7 towns.
Subdistricts
 Chengguan Subdistrict

Towns

Climate

Transport
Xi'an–Yan'an Railway

References

County-level divisions of Shaanxi
Weinan